Below are the results of the 2016 World Series of Poker, held from May 31-July 18 at the Rio All Suite Hotel and Casino in Paradise, Nevada.

Key

Results

Source:

Event #1: $565 Casino Employees No Limit Hold'em

 2-Day Event: June 1–2
 Number of Entries: 731
 Total Prize Pool: $365,500
 Number of Payouts: 110
 Winning Hand:

Event #2: $565 Colossus II No Limit Hold'em

 6-Day Event: June 2–7
 Number of Entries: 21,613
 Total Prize Pool: $10,806,500
 Number of Payouts: 2,922
 Winning Hand:

Event #3: $10,000 Seven Card Stud Championship

 3-Day Event: June 4–6
 Number of Entries: 87
 Total Prize Pool: $817,800
 Number of Payouts: 14
 Winning Hand:

Event #4: $1,000 Top Up Turbo No Limit Hold'em

 2-Day Event: June 5–6
 Number of Entries: 667
 Total Prize Pool: $681,300
 Number of Payouts: 101
 Winning Hand:

Event #5: $1,500 Dealers Choice Six-Handed

 3-Day Event: June 5–7
 Number of Entries: 389
 Total Prize Pool: $525,150
 Number of Payouts: 59
 Winning Hand:  (Omaha Hi-Lo)

Event #6: $1,500 No Limit Hold'em

 4-Day Event: June 6–9
 Number of Entries: 2,016
 Total Prize Pool: $2,721,600
 Number of Payouts: 303
 Winning Hand:

Event #7: $1,500 2-7 No Limit Draw Lowball

 3-Day Event: June 6–8
 Number of Entries: 279
 Total Prize Pool: $376,650
 Number of Payouts: 42
 Winning Hand:

Event #8: $1,500 H.O.R.S.E.

 3-Day Event: June 7–9
 Number of Entries: 778
 Total Prize Pool: $1,050,300
 Number of Payouts: 117
 Winning Hand:  (Seven Card Stud)

Event #9: $10,000 Heads Up No Limit Hold'em Championship

 3-Day Event: June 7–9
 Number of Entries: 153
 Total Prize Pool: $1,188,200
 Number of Payouts: 16
 Winning Hand:

Event #10: $1,500 Six-Handed No Limit Hold'em

 3-Day Event: June 8–10
 Number of Entries: 1,477
 Total Prize Pool: $1,993,950
 Number of Payouts: 222 
 Winning Hand:

Event #11: $10,000 Dealers Choice Six-Handed Championship

 3-Day Event: June 8–10
 Number of Entries: 118
 Total Prize Pool: $1,109,200
 Number of Payouts: 18
 Winning Hand:  (No Limit Hold'em)

Event #12: $565 Pot Limit Omaha

 3-Day Event: June 9–11
 Number of Entries: 2,483
 Total Prize Pool: $1,241,500
 Number of Payouts: 373
 Winning Hand:

Event #13: $1,500 Seven Card Razz

 3-Day Event: June 9–11
 Number of Entries: 461
 Total Prize Pool: $622,350
 Number of Payouts: 70
 Winning Hand:

Event #14: $1,500 Millionaire Maker No Limit Hold'em

 5-Day Event: June 10–14
 Number of Entries: 7,190
 Total Prize Pool: $9,706,500
 Number of Payouts: 1,079
 Winning Hand:

Event #15: $1,500 Eight Game Mix

 3-Day Event: June 10–12
 Number of Entries: 491
 Total Prize Pool: $662,850
 Number of Payouts: 74
 Winning Hand:  (Pot Limit Omaha)

Event #16: $10,000 2-7 No Limit Draw Lowball Championship

 3-Day Event: June 11–13
 Number of Entries: 100
 Total Prize Pool: $940,000
 Number of Payouts: 15
 Winning Hand:

Event #17: $1,000 No Limit Hold'em

 3-Day Event: June 12–14
 Number of Entries: 2,242
 Total Prize Pool: $2,017,800
 Number of Payouts: 337
 Winning Hand:

Event #18: $3,000 H.O.R.S.E.

 3-Day Event: June 12–14
 Number of Entries: 400
 Total Prize Pool: $1,092,000
 Number of Payouts: 60
 Winning Hand:  (Seven Card Stud)

Event #19: $1,000 Pot Limit Omaha

 3-Day Event: June 13–15
 Number of Entries: 1,106
 Total Prize Pool: $995,400
 Number of Payouts: 166
 Winning Hand:

Event #20: $10,000 Seven Card Razz Championship

 3-Day Event: June 13–15
 Number of Entries: 100
 Total Prize Pool: $940,000
 Number of Payouts: 15
 Winning Hand:

Event #21: $3,000 Six-Handed No Limit Hold'em

 4-Day Event: June 14–17
 Number of Entries: 1,029
 Total Prize Pool: $2,809,170
 Number of Payouts: 155
 Winning Hand:

Event #22: $1,500 Limit Hold'em

 3-Day Event: June 14–16
 Number of Entries: 665
 Total Prize Pool: $897,750
 Number of Payouts: 100
 Winning Hand:

Event #23: $2,000 No Limit Hold'em

 4-Day Event: June 15–18
 Number of Entries: 1,419
 Total Prize Pool: $2,554,200
 Number of Payouts: 213
 Winning Hand:

Event #24: $10,000 H.O.R.S.E. Championship

 3-Day Event: June 15–17
 Number of Entries: 171
 Total Prize Pool: $1,607,400
 Number of Payouts: 26
 Winning Hand:  (Limit Hold'em)

Event #25: $2,500 No Limit Hold'em

 3-Day Event: June 16–18
 Number of Entries: 1,045
 Total Prize Pool: $2,377,375
 Number of Payouts: 157
 Winning Hand:

Event #26: $1,500 Omaha Hi-Low Split-8 or Better

 3-Day Event: June 16–18
 Number of Entries: 934
 Total Prize Pool: $1,260,900
 Number of Payouts: 141
 Winning Hand:

Event #27: $1,000 Seniors No Limit Hold'em Championship

 4-Day Event: June 17–20
 Number of Entries: 4,499
 Total Prize Pool: $4,049,100
 Number of Payouts: 675
 Winning Hand:

Event #28: $10,000 Limit Hold'em Championship

 3-Day Event: June 17–19
 Number of Entries: 110
 Total Prize Pool: $1,034,000
 Number of Payouts: 17
 Winning Hand:

Event #29: $1,500 No Limit Hold'em

 4-Day Event: June 18–21
 Number of Entries: 1,796
 Total Prize Pool: $2,424,600
 Number of Payouts: 270
 Winning Hand:

Event #30: $3,000 Six-Handed Pot Limit Omaha

 3-Day Event: June 18–20
 Number of Entries: 580
 Total Prize Pool: $1,583,400
 Number of Payouts: 87
 Winning Hand:

Event #31: $1,000 Super Seniors No Limit Hold'em

 3-Day Event: June 19–21
 Number of Entries: 1,476
 Total Prize Pool: $1,328,400
 Number of Payouts: 222
 Winning Hand:

Event #32: $10,000 Omaha Hi-Low Split-8 or Better Championship

 4-Day Event: June 19–22
 Number of Entries: 163
 Total Prize Pool: $1,532,200
 Number of Payouts: 25
 Winning Hand:

Event #33: $1,500 Summer Solstice No Limit Hold'em

 5-Day Event: June 20–24 
 Number of Entries: 1,840
 Total Prize Pool: $2,484,000
 Number of Payouts: 276
 Winning Hand:

Event #34: $1,500 2-7 Limit Triple Draw Lowball

 3-Day Event: June 20–22
 Number of Entries: 358
 Total Prize Pool: $483,300
 Number of Payouts: 54
 Winning Hand:

Event #35: $5,000 Six-Handed No Limit Hold'em

 3-Day Event: June 21–23
 Number of Entries: 541
 Total Prize Pool: $2,542,700
 Number of Payouts: 82
 Winning Hand:

Event #36: $2,500 Mixed Omaha/Seven Card Stud Hi-Lo 8 or Better

 3-Day Event: June 21–23
 Number of Entries: 394
 Total Prize Pool: $896,350
 Number of Payouts: 60
 Winning Hand:

Event #37: $1,500 Pot Limit Omaha

 3-Day Event: June 22–24
 Number of Entries: 776
 Total Prize Pool: $1,047,600
 Number of Payouts: 117
 Winning Hand:

Event #38: $3,000 Six-Handed Limit Hold'em

 3-Day Event: June 22–24
 Number of Entries: 245
 Total Prize Pool: $668,850
 Number of Payouts: 37
 Winning Hand:

Event #39: $10,000 Six-Handed No Limit Hold'em Championship

 3-Day Event: June 23–25
 Number of Entries: 294
 Total Prize Pool: $2,763,600
 Number of Payouts: 45
 Winning Hand:

Event #40: $2,500 Mixed Limit Triple Draw Lowball

 3-Day Event: June 23–25
 Number of Entries: 236
 Total Prize Pool: $536,900
 Number of Payouts: 36
 Winning Hand: A-7-5-3-2

Event #41: $1,500 Monster Stack No Limit Hold'em

 5-Day Event: June 24–28 
 Number of Entries: 6,927
 Total Prize Pool: $9,351,450
 Number of Payouts: 1,040
 Winning Hand:

Event #42: $3,000 Shootout No Limit Hold'em

 3-Day Event: June 24–26
 Number of Entries: 400
 Total Prize Pool: $1,092,600
 Number of Payouts: 40
 Winning Hand:

Event #43: $10,000 Seven Card Stud Hi-Lo Split-8 or Better Championship

 3-Day Event: June 25–27
 Number of Entries: 136
 Total Prize Pool: $1,278,400
 Number of Payouts: 21
 Winning Hand:

Event #44: $1,000 No Limit Hold'em

 4-Day Event: June 26–29
 Number of Entries: 2,076
 Total Prize Pool: $1,868,400
 Number of Payouts: 312
 Winning Hand:

Event #45: $1,500 Mixed No Limit Hold'em/Pot Limit Omaha

 3-Day Event: June 26–28
 Number of Entries: 919
 Total Prize Pool: $1,240,650
 Number of Payouts: 138
 Winning Hand:

Event #46: $1,500 Bounty No Limit Hold'em

 4-Day Event: June 27–30
 Number of Entries: 2,158
 Total Prize Pool: $1,834,300
 Number of Payouts: 324
 Winning Hand:

Event #47: $10,000 2-7 Limit Triple Draw Lowball Championship

 3-Day Event: June 27–29
 Number of Entries: 125
 Total Prize Pool: $1,175,000
 Number of Payouts: 19
 Winning Hand:

Event #48: $5,000 No Limit Hold'em

 2-Day Event: June 28–29
 Number of Entries: 524
 Total Prize Pool: $2,462,000
 Number of Payouts: 79
 Winning Hand:

Event #49: $1,500 Seven Card Stud

 3-Day Event: June 28–30
 Number of Entries: 331
 Total Prize Pool: $446,850
 Number of Payouts: 50
 Winning Hand:

Event #50: $1,500 Shootout No Limit Hold'em

 3-Day Event: June 29-July 1
 Number of Entries: 1,050
 Total Prize Pool: $1,417,500
 Number of Payouts: 120
 Winning Hand:

Event #51: $10,000 Eight-Handed Pot Limit Omaha Championship

 4-Day Event: June 29-July 2
 Number of Entries: 400
 Total Prize Pool: $3,760,000
 Number of Payouts: 60 
 Winning Hand:

Event #52: $3,000 No Limit Hold'em

 4-Day Event: June 30-July 3
 Number of Entries: 1,125
 Total Prize Pool: $3,071,250
 Number of Payouts: 169
 Winning Hand:

Event #53: $1,500 Mixed Pot Limit Omaha 8 or Better/Big O

 4-Day Event: June 30-July 3
 Number of Entries: 668
 Total Prize Pool: $901,800
 Number of Payouts: 101
 Winning Hand:

Event #54: $888 Crazy Eights Eight-Handed No Limit Hold'em

 4-Day Event: July 1–4
 Number of Entries: 6,761
 Total Prize Pool: $5,403,391
 Number of Payouts: 956
 Winning Hand:

Event #55: $50,000 Poker Players Championship

 5-Day Event: July 2–6
 Number of Entries: 91
 Total Prize Pool: $4,176,000
 Number of Payouts: 14
 Winning Hand:  (No Limit Hold'em)

Event #56: $1,500 No Limit Hold'em

 3-Day Event: July 3–5
 Number of Entries: 1,860
 Total Prize Pool: $2,511,000
 Number of Payouts: 279
 Winning Hand:

Event #57: $1,500 Pot Limit Omaha Hi-Lo Split-8 or Better

 3-Day Event: July 3–5
 Number of Entries: 732
 Total Prize Pool: $988,100
 Number of Payouts: 110
 Winning Hand:

Event #58: $1,000 No Limit Hold'em

 2-Day Event: July 4–5
 Number of Entries: 1,397
 Total Prize Pool: $1,257,300
 Number of Payouts: 210
 Winning Hand:

Event #59: $5,000 No Limit Hold'em

 4-Day Event: July 5–8 
 Number of Entries: 863
 Total Prize Pool: $4,056,100
 Number of Payouts: 130
 Winning Hand:

Event #60: $1,500 Seven Card Stud Hi-Lo 8 or Better

 3-Day Event: July 5–7
 Number of Entries: 521
 Total Prize Pool: $703,350
 Number of Payouts: 79
 Winning Hand:

Event #61: $1,000 Tag Team No Limit Hold'em

 3-Day Event: July 6–8
 Number of Entries: 863
 Total Prize Pool: $776,700
 Number of Payouts: 130
 Winning Hand:

Event #62: $25,000 High Roller Pot Limit Omaha

 4-Day Event: July 6–9 
 Number of Entries: 184
 Total Prize Pool: $4,370,000
 Number of Payouts: 28
 Winning Hand:

Event #63: $1,000 No Limit Hold'em

 3-Day Event: July 7–9
 Number of Entries: 2,452
 Total Prize Pool: $2,206,800
 Number of Payouts: 368
 Winning Hand:

Event #64: $3,000 Pot Limit Omaha Hi-Lo Split 8 or Better

 3-Day Event: July 7–9
 Number of Entries: 473
 Total Prize Pool: $1,291,290
 Number of Payouts: 71
 Winning Hand:

Event #65: $10,000/$1,000 Ladies No Limit Hold'em Championship

 3-Day Event: July 8–10
 Number of Entries: 819
 Total Prize Pool: $745,200
 Number of Payouts: 123
 Winning Hand:

Event #66: $1,000 WSOP.com Online No Limit Hold'em

 1-Day Event: July 8
 Final Table: July 11 
 Number of Entries: 1,247
 Total Prize Pool: $1,184,650
 Number of Payouts: 153
 Winning Hand:

Event #67: $111,111 High Roller for One Drop No Limit Hold'em

 3-Day Event: July 8–10
 Number of Entries: 183
 Total Prize Pool: $19,316,565
 Number of Payouts: 28
 Winning Hand:

Event #68: $10,000 Main Event No Limit Hold'em Championship

The finalists for this event, known as the November Nine, competed in the fall to determine the champion; The event location is the Penn & Teller Theater.

 10-Day Event: July 9–18
 Final Table: October 30-November 1 
 Number of Entries: 6,737
 Total Prize Pool: $63,327,800
 Number of Payouts: 1,011
 Winning Hand:

Event #69: $1,000 + 111 Little One for One Drop No Limit Hold'em

 6-Day Event: July 12–17
 Number of Entries: 4,360
 Total Prize Pool: $3,924,000
 Number of Payouts: 654
 Winning Hand:

References

External links
WSOP schedule

World Series of Poker
World Series of Poker Results, 2016